Devergan-e Sofla (also Romanized as Devergān-e Soflá; also known as Daverjān-e Pā’īn, Daverjān-e Soflá, Devergān, and Devergān-e Pā’īn) is a village in Padena-ye Olya Rural District, Padena District, Semirom County, Isfahan Province, Iran. At the 2006 census, its population was 125, in 26 families.

References 

Populated places in Semirom County